The Winemiller Family Farm is a historic home and farm complex located at Taneytown, Carroll County, Maryland, United States. The complex consists of a large two-story brick house built about 1865, a frame bank barn, and several outbuildings. It is a representative example of a type of family farm complex that characterized rural agricultural Carroll County from about 1850 through the early 20th century.

The Winemiller Family Farm was listed on the National Register of Historic Places in 2006.

References

External links
, including photo from 2003, at Maryland Historical Trust

Farms on the National Register of Historic Places in Maryland
Houses in Carroll County, Maryland
Houses completed in 1865
Taneytown, Maryland
National Register of Historic Places in Carroll County, Maryland